United Nations Security Council resolution 1134, adopted on 23 October 1997, after recalling resolutions 687 (1991), 707 (1991), 715 (1991), 1060 (1996) and 1115 (1997) on the monitoring of Iraq's weapons programme, the Council demanded that Iraq co-operate with weapons inspection teams from the United Nations Special Commission (UNSCOM) and expressed its intention to impose travel bans on Iraqi officials in the event of non-compliance.

The council noted that, since the adoption of Resolution 1115, there were incidents where inspection teams from UNSCOM were denied access to sites and persons by the Government of Iraq. It stated that such incidents were unacceptable, and warned of further measures if this continued. Nevertheless, the commission made progress in the termination of Iraq's weapons of mass destruction programme.

Acting under Chapter VII of the United Nations Charter, the council condemned the refusal of Iraqi authorities to allow access by United Nations inspectors to sites and persons it requested, as well as endangering the safety of UNSCOM and the removal or destruction of documents of interest. It concluded that the obstruction constituted violations of previous Security Council resolutions and demanded that Iraq co-operate with UNSCOM in allowing it access to sites and persons it requested. In the event of non-compliance, then all countries were to deny access to Iraqi officials on their territory. The resolution decided to begin the creation a list of officials to whom the travel ban would apply if the measures were implemented.

Resolution 1134 was adopted by 10 votes to none against and five abstentions from China, Egypt, France, Kenya and Russia, who were opposed to different aspects of the resolution. China and Russia expressed reservations about the practicality of imposing sanctions; and Egypt, France and Kenya wished to further discuss proposals and amendments before the resolution was put to vote.

See also
 Foreign relations of Iraq
 Gulf War
 Invasion of Kuwait
 Iraq and weapons of mass destruction
 Iraq disarmament timeline 1990–2003
 Iraq sanctions
 List of United Nations Security Council Resolutions 1101 to 1200 (1997–1998)

References

External links
 
Text of the Resolution at undocs.org

 1134
 1134
1997 in Iraq
Iraq and weapons of mass destruction
 1134
October 1997 events